Cy-Fair High School is a secondary school located in Cypress, which is an unincorporated place in Harris County, Texas, near Houston. The school is located along U.S. Highway 290 and is part of the Cypress-Fairbanks Independent School District. Cy-Fair High School is the only CFISD high school with a hyphen in its official name. The school mascot is the bobcat, and the school's colors are white and maroon. Students attending the school have classes from 7:15 a.m. to 2:40 p.m.

History

Establishment of the Cypress and Fairbanks's separate school systems, Cypress School, and Rural High School No. 5 
When the New Orleans Railroad Company's track line to Houston was built in 1856, two towns were established, with Cypress on one side of the track and Fairbanks on the other. Cypress and Fairbanks remained being two separate towns with separate school systems throughout the early 1900s. Though both of their school systems had schools for children up to eighth grade, once they reached high school, students in Fairbanks had to travel to Houston every day for school, and the Cypress high school students had to travel to Addicks. 

A 20-acre plot of land that was handed out to the district by Louis Telge, also known as the grandfather of the previous School Board members John and Chester Telge. On the newly donated land, a school called, "Big Cypress Schoolhouse, No. 2. Dist. 6," was built in the year of 1884, in Cypress, Texas. It was also called the "Cypress School". When it was first built in 1884, the building was a one room school, however, over the years, new rooms were build on, and soon enough, the Cypress School later consisted of seven rooms, a superintendent's office, a library, and a wood-framed schoolhouse for high school students by 1937. By that year, however, was when elementary and high school students who went to this school were divided up, and the high school students transitioned to a separate facility. The facility they were transferred to was Rural High School No. 5, built in 1937, which was part of the Fairbanks School District. In December of 1939, citizens voted to get the two districts to unite together into one.

The opening of Cy-Fair High School, Racial Desegregation, Carverdale Students, and Jersey Village High School 
Finally, a few years after Cypress and Fairbanks had officially consolidated, Cy-Fair High School was officially opened in the spring of 1942, and students from Rural High School No. 5 were transferred to the new school. The school received its accreditation less than a year after opening. According to Community Impact, Jane Ledbetter with the Cypress Historical Society had said that the school "really solidified the two districts coming together." and that it was "symbolic". Meanwhile, the wood framed schoolhouse at the Cypress School burned down that same year. 

Since the Cypress area was more rural at the time, many students in the area lived on farms, so the school system had a very strong agricultural program. However, in the latter half of the 20th century, Cypress was transitioning from rural to suburban. As Cypress started to grow rapidly over time, becoming more suburban, the school leaders recognized the need for stronger academics. T.S. Hancock, who was a superintendent from 1955 to 1967, implemented individualized teaching methods and a complete testing program to measure scholastic achievement. The teachers at the school during this time received in-service training, and more emphasis was placed on science, math, electronics, foreign languages, and journalism.

Following court-ordered desegregation, the Carverdale School for African-American students, which was open from 1926-1970 and served students ranging from 1st grade to 12th grade, was permanently shut down on August 3, 1970, and the students who were stationed to attend school at Carverdale school were transferred to Cy-Fair High School. African-American students first began enrolling at Cy-Fair in 1966 under the "Freedom of Choice" option that was available that year. When the former students of Carverdale transferred to Cy-Fair, one member (Andrew Jones) of Carverdale's basketball team joined the Cy-Fair High School team, which won celebrated state and national championships in 1971. Years later, the building that was once Carverdale School was repurposed as the Carverdale campus for the Houston Community College System, only to later become torn down and replaced with industrial warehouses. 

Cy-Fair High School remained the only standing high school in the Cypress Fairbanks School District until Jersey Village High School opened in 1972.

School Renovation starting in the 90s, 2016 Flood, 2017 Super Bowl, Rezoning, and Hurricane Harvey 
For 1999-2001, the school was renovated and expanded, adding 20 classrooms and a new library. Plans were made to renovate the school in 1998, due to the school becoming increasingly cramped over the years and the desire to update the classrooms to make way for advancing technology. Voters approved for a bond issue that granted the school more than $29 million in funding for the restoration of the building. They started in the summer of 1999. The roof of the main corridor at the school was soon removed, and the old Cy-Fair Brigade gym was taken down.

Cy-Fair High School was flooded after a heavy rainfall on April 18, 2016 that left a flood in the greater Houston area due to the April 2016 North American storm complex, sometimes referred to as the "Tax Day Flood" by some. The flood left some damage to Cy-Fair High School, and the carpet had to be replaced in twenty classrooms, as well as the carpet for the school library. The floor for the school's weight room also had to be removed and replaced. Cy-Fair was one of the 57 campuses in the Cypress Fairbanks District that faced damage due to the flood. Unsurprisingly, all of the schools in the district were closed from April 18–22.

On Sunday, February 5, 2017, the Cy-Fair High School Brigade, along with many other dance teams from the school district, performed with Lady Gaga at the Super Bowl LI Halftime show that took place at NRG Stadium in Houston, Texas.

As part of high school rezoning, a portion of Cy-Fair's attendance zone, as well as portions of Cypress Falls High School and Cypress Woods High School's attendance zones, was to be reassigned to Cypress Ranch High School in 2017.

On August 26th, 2017, the school was, once again, flooded, as a result of Hurricane Harvey. Cy-Fair High School, as well as all of the schools in the Cypress Fairbanks District, postponed the first day of school for the school year of 2017-2018 for two weeks before reopening and setting its new first day of the school year on September 11, 2017. Shortly after the hurricane hit, Cy-Fair High School’s rugby team volunteered to clean out the flood-damaged homes within their community, twenty-seven homes being the total amount that they helped to clean out. As a result, they were honored with a plaque for their contributions to the community.

Covid-19 Pandemic and 2021 Snow Storm 
At the start of the Covid-19 pandemic that started COVID-19 lockdowns during the spring of 2020, Cy-Fair High School and the rest of the schools in the Cypress-Fairbanks School District shut down their campuses, cancelling all in person classes for the rest of the 2019-2020 school year and transitioning them to an online learning option that was created for students and teachers to use online without being on campus. 

When the new school year 2020-2021 rolled around, teachers and some students returned to campus for a traditional classroom setting, although students had the option to continue to use online learning at home that year as well. Some officials have said that they believe that the students benefited with the in-person option rather than the newer online option. For 2021-2022, though Cy-Fair students would no longer have the option to learn via the online remote learning program, this program that was put for the 2020-21 school year would be held on to for students after the COVID-19 pandemic in case remote learning is needed in the future due to an emergency. Linda Macias, also known as The Chief Academic Officer, said that because of CFISD needing to create the online learning program due to the pandemic, the school district had broken down innumerable technological barriers that had been in the way of students and teachers before.

In February 2021, Cy-Fair High School and the rest of the school district were shut down when Texas was hit with a snowstorm, caused by the February 2021 North American cold wave, that lasted from February 11 until February 20, which resulted in the 2021 Texas power crisis. It left more than 60 of the campuses throughout the district with massive water damage, some suffering with burst pipes caused by power outages and extremely low temperatures. The students were able to return to school on February 22, with the damages being fixed.

In the school year 2020-2021, due to the Covid-19 pandemic, Cy-Fair High School students, staff, and teachers were required to wear a face mask on campus to protect each other from contacting Covid-19. Although Governor Greg Abbott made his announcement that went effective on March 10, 2021, which stated that Texans will no longer be required by state law to wear a mask in public, the school and the other schools in the district were still legally allowed to implement mask mandates. 

However, later on, in May of that same year, the district soon had no choice but to end the mandate due to Abbott signing an executive order that banned government entities, including public schools, from mandating masks. Therefore, face masks in Cy-Fair High School, and every other school in their district, were restricted from being able to choose whether or not to make mask mandates active in 2021-2022. On the other hand, they were able to keep social distancing guidelines in Cy-Fair High School, like in all of the schools in the district until the pandemic was over. 

Out of all of the schools in the Cypress Fairbanks School District, Cy-Fair High School has had the highest number of confirmed Covid-19 cases in the 2021-22 school year, according to district data.

Academics
For the 2018-2019 school year, the school received an A grade from the Texas Education Agency, with an overall score of 90 out of 100. The school received a B grade in two domains, School Progress (score of 87) and Closing the Gaps (score of 85), and an A grade in Student Achievement (score of 92). The school received one of the seven possible distinction designations for Top 25%: Comparative Academic Growth. Cy-Fair was one out of the thirteen CFISD schools have been named to the 2018-2019 Texas Honor Roll, which is an award that recognizes public elementary, middle and high schools that demonstrate high levels of student academic achievement, improvement in achievement over time, and reduction in achievement gaps. For high schools, Honor Roll recognition includes measures of college readiness in students.

The average SAT score at Cy-Fair High School was 1177 for 2018-2019 graduates. The average ACT score was 20.5.

Athletics
Cy-Fair competes athletically in District 17-6A of the University Interscholastic League.

Football
The 1985 football team finished with a 13-1-1 record, losing to perennial power Permian High School 7-10 in the 5A state semifinals.

The 1987 football team finished with a 9-4-1 record, losing to eventual state champion Plano Senior High School  21-24 in the 5A state quarterfinals. The previous week's game versus undefeated 12-0 North Mesquite High School was voted the "high school football game of the decade" by the newspaper sportswriters of the State. Cy-Fair purposefully let North Mesquite score late in the game to get the ball back because they trailed statistically. At the time there was no overtime in Texas high school football, tie games in the playoffs were decided by statistics. Cy-Fair then scored late to tie the score 28-28 and advanced on first downs. 

In 2017, the football team was undefeated with at 15-0 record winning the 6A Division 2 State Championship over Waco Midway High School

In 2018, the football team ended the season 11-3 competing in 17-6A Division 1, losing to eventual state champions North Shore High School in the Quarterfinals.

In 2019, the football team ended the season 11-1 as undefeated 17-6A Division Champions with five shutouts, losing only to Katy High School in the Area playoffs.

The 2020 football season ended with another undefeated 17-6A Division 1 District Championship and a record of 10-2. Cy-Fair outscored district opponents 345-37.

On November 18, 2022, on a Friday, Cy-Fair High School (10-2) played against Cinco Ranch High School (9-3), both combined to score 1,030 points entering this matchup, but defense ruled the day in this one as both units rose to the occasion. Cy-Fair lost, and their 10-game winning streak was officially broken with this loss, while Cinco Ranch moved up to the regional semifinals.

Boys' Basketball
The 1969-70 boys' basketball team advanced to the 3A state championship game, losing in the final.

In the 1970-71 season, the team won the 4A State Championship, and were given the honorific title of "National Champions." The 1970-71 season was the first in 4A for Cy-Fair High School It it worth noting that Cy-Fair only used five players in the State Championship game againt Wheatley. The five were twin brothers Ronald and Donald Dunlap, Jerry Mercer, Bobby Metcalf and Andrew Jones. Jones transferred to Cy-Fair from Carverdale, when Carverdale was closed in the summer of 1970. The other four starters played on the 1969-1970 State 3A runner-up team. 

The team advanced to the 4A state semifinals in the 1977-78 season.

Boys' basketball was co-district champion for the first time in over a decade in the 2019-20 season achieving a 25-9 overall record and 13-2 in district.

Girls' Basketball
The girls' basketball team won the 5A state championship in the 2007-08 season, defeating DeSoto High School in the final with senior All-American Nneka Ogwumike and her sister sophomore Chiney Ogwumike. The team won another 5A state championship in the 2009-10 season.

Volleyball
The 1986-87 girls' volleyball team were the 5A state champions, defeating Amarillo High School in the final.

The 2007-2008 girls' volleyball team competed in 5A Region III District 17, achieving a 45-3 overall record with an undefeated district season at 15-0. The team ranked 5th in the state of Texas and 49th nationally.

The 2013-14 girls' volleyball team competed in 5A Region III District 17, achieving a 45-4 overall record with an undefeated district season at 18-0. The team ranked 8th in the state of Texas and 47th nationally.

Cross Country 
The Cy-Fair high school girls’ cross country teams placed among the top 15 teams at the UIL Class 6A Cross Country State Championships, held on November 8, 2014, at Old Settlers Park in Round Rock. Cy-Fair placed 10th overall with a score of 235.

Swimming 
The 2021-2022 girls’ swim team claimed the District 17-6A titles, with 140 points, on February 2, 2022.

Music

Band 
On August 14, 2017, the Cy-Fair High School marching band claimed the grand champion award, or first place in Enrollment Class V, repeating in earning the top award at the third annual Battle at the Berry Marching Contest at Cy-Fair FCU Stadium. It was hosted by the Cypress Springs High School marching band. It featured 19 bands from across the Houston area competing in four different classifications based on marching band enrollments.

On April 2nd, 2022, at the Texas Color Guard Circuit Percussion/Winds State Championship Finals that was held at Texas A&M University's Reed Arena, Cy-Fair High School's indoor percussion ensemble won in its distinct division, known as the Percussion Scholastic Open division. They were first place in the Percussion Scholastic Open. They performed their winning performance at 7:35 pm on April 2nd.

Choir 
On March 2, 2019, the Cy-Fair High School’s Cy-Fair Singers won first place at the prestigious Madrigal & Chamber Choir Festival at the Coker United Methodist Church in San Antonio. They were crowned first-place winners out of 38 competing ensembles. They were named as the 2020 honor choir.

JROTC 
In the second Marksmanship and Drill Meet, Cy-Fair High School won 10 trophies in 2018.

Cy-Fair High School Air Force JROTC unit has won the Distinguished Unit Award for four years in a row, starting from the school year 2016-2017 and until 2019-2020.

Journalism 
The school won two awards for their student-produced publications, one of which was recognized at the Columbia Scholastic Press Association Spring Scholastic Convention, held March 16–18 at Columbia University in New York City. Journalism students at Cy-Fair High School receive a Silver Crown Award at the 2016 CSPA Spring Convention for their 2014-2015 student newspaper, The Reporter. The Reporter was one of 14 schools nationwide to receive the Silver News Print Crown. Prior to the CSPA convention, the 2014-2015 Cy-Fair yearbook, The Bobcat, won the Gold Medalist Certificate. In addition, the Reporter staff won third place in the Typography: Overall look of the entire paper category.

Art 
For the art contest held by the Houston Livestock Show and Rodeo, in 2021, three Cy-Fair students won the 2021 Blue Ribbon Award, and one student even made it into the 2D finalist category, receiving a special merit award.

Foreign Language 
In the 25th annual Texas State German Contest that happened in 2007, held at the University of Texas at Austin, Cy-Fair High School was placed in second place, followed by Austin Westwood High School. Because Cy-Fair had made it into the top 5, they received a plaque and a monetary contribution.

Clubs 
Cy-Fair High School has many after school clubs, such as: 

 Book Club
 Computer Science Club 
 Science Olympiad
 Animation Club
 Spanish Club 
 Key Club
 HOSA
 Asian Student Association
 PALS
 Paws For A Cause
 BCTV (Bobcat TV) 
 Physics Club 
 Future Business Leaders of America
 Sociedad Honoraria Hispánica
 Drama Club
 Environmental Action Committee
 Future Farmers of America
 Anime Club
 Guitar Club
 Magic: The Gathering (MTG) Club
 Destination Imagination
 Chess Club
 Family, Career and Community Leaders of America.
 Black Student Union (BSU) 
 Art Club
 FCA
 FCCLA
 Finance Club
 No Place For Hate
 Student Mental Health Alliance
 Table Top Teenagers

Demographics

Students 
The demographic breakdown of the 3,427 students enrolled for 2022-23 was:
White: 33.3%
Hispanic: 37.6%
African American: 16.4%
Asian: 8.7%
Native American: 0.5%
Pacific Islander: 0.2%
Two or More Races: 3.3%

43.1% of students attending Cy-Fair High School are economically disadvantaged.

38.4%  of the students were eligible for free or reduced-cost lunch in the school year of 2019-2020.

For the class of 2020, the four-year graduation rate at Cy-fair High School is 94.2%, and the dropout rate for all students, regardless of grade level, was 0.9% in the school year of 2019-2020. 

In 2018-2019, 3.5% of the students were enrolled in bilingual and English language learning programs. This increased in the school year 2020-2021, with the percentage being 4.2%.

Teachers/Staff 
The average number of years a teacher has been employed in any district, whether or not there was an interruption in service, is 12.5 years.

The average teacher salary at the school is $55,737.

Feeder patterns 
All Arnold Middle School and some Hamilton Middle School students are within Cy-Fair High School's attendance boundary.

There are four elementary schools that feed into Arnold Middle School:
 Adam Elementary
 Danish Elementary (partial)
 Lamkin Elementary (partial)
 Millsap Elementary (partial)

There are two elementary schools that feed into Hamilton Middle School within Cy-Fair's attendance boundary:
 Black Elementary (partial)
 Hamilton Elementary (partial)

Notable alumni
Austin Deculus — National Football League (NFL) player
Robbie Grossman — Major League Baseball (MLB) outfielder
Lindsey Harding — professional basketball player
James Lopez — Senior Vice President of Production for Screen Gems
Jonathan Horton — gymnast
Braden Mann — National Football League (NFL) player
Sam McGuffie — National Football League (NFL) player, Olympic bobsledder
Cal McNair — National Football League (NFL) owner
Cody Risien — National Football League (NFL) player
Sandy Duncan — Actress, comedian, singer, and dancer; was in  The Hogan Family, Miracle on Interstate-880, The Swan Princess, and Rock-A-Doodle; was nominated for three Tony awards 
James Lopez — Movie Producer, produced movie such as Little, Girls Trip, What Men Want, and Beast
Johnny Rizer — Major League Baseball (MLB) outfielder
Carlene Watkins — actress, was on shows such as Best of the West, Tough Enough, and Tortellis
Fred Whitfield — calf roper
Woody Williams — MLB pitcher
Brock Wright — National Football League (NFL) player
Tony Wyllie — NFL executive
Robert Beauchamp — CEO of BMC Software
Chiney Ogwumike — Women's National Basketball Association (WNBA) professional basketball player
Nneka Ogwumike — Women's National Basketball Association (WNBA) professional basketball player
Tony Oller — actor/musician, was on Disney Channel for the show As the Bell Rings and other shows such as CSI: NY and Gigantic
Ren Patrick — singer/American Idol contestant
Cannan Brumley — documentary producer and writer; produced "Ears, Open. Eyeballs, Click."

Notable faculty
Dan Kubiak, member of the Texas House of Representatives from 1969–83 and again from 1991-98, taught and coached at Cy-Fair from 1963-68
Ed Pustejovsky, head football coach from 2004-2020 and campus athletic director at Cy-Fair High School. Seven district football titles and 13 playoff trips. 6A Div II state championship title in 2017

References

External links
 
  and at schools.cy-fair.isd.tenet.edu/cyfair/index.html 

Educational institutions established in 1942
Cypress-Fairbanks Independent School District high schools
1942 establishments in Texas